Skelivka is a village in Lviv Oblast, Sambir Raion, Ukraine on the Strwiąż River. It belongs to Khyriv urban hromada, one of the hromadas of Ukraine. 

The village is located a few kilometers from the border with Poland, in the eastern part of the Bieszczady Mountains, near the towns of Przemyśl (in southeastern Poland) and Dobromil and Stryj (in western Ukraine). It is situated below the main watershed at the foot of the Carpathian Mountains, and has an elevation of 250 meters.

Felsztyn, as the settlement is called in Polish, was founded in 1374 by King Ludwik Węgierski, on lands granted by Duke Vladislaus II of Opole to the  noble family, and received town privileges under the Magdeburg rights in 1380. Additional privileges were granted to the town in 1488 by Kazimierz Jagiellończyk and in 1551 by Sigismund II Augustus. The name was historically variously spelled as Fulsztyn, Folsteyn, Felstin, Fullensteyn, Fulsthine and Fulstin (1593). Its name comes from the town of Bohušov in present day Czech Republic, until 1950 called Fulštejn in Czech, also belonging to the Herburt family. Another Felsztyn was founded in Podolia, today known in  Ukrainian as Hvardiiske.  

Until the First Partition of Poland in 1772 the town belonged was part of the Przemyśl County of the Ruthenian Voivodeship. From 1772 to 1918 it belonged to the Austrian Empire (later the Austro-Hungarian Empire when the double monarchy was introduced in Austria). During 1918 - 1939 Felsztyn was part of the Stary Samobr County of the Lwów Voivodeship in the Second Republic of Poland.
 
In 1872 the Dniestr Railway was built through the town from Chyrów, where it connected with the First Hungarian-Galician Railway to Sambor and on to a junction with the Archduke Albrecht Railway in Stryj. The line went on to eventually become a part of the Galician Transversal Railway in 1884. 

On September 17, 1939, Felsztyn was occupied by the Soviet Union, and since the collapse of the Soviet Union in 1991, is part of independent Ukraine.

In the interwar years, Felsztyn had a mixed population of Poles, Ukrainians and Jews. The Jews were killed in World War II, while the area's Poles were deported to Siberia in cattle trucks after the Soviet invasion. Many of these Poles died in Siberia, some were able to leave Siberia with General Anders Army, while others eventually returned to Felsztyn in 1956 only to find their homes occupied by strangers or demolished. Most surviving Poles were moved to western Poland (mainly Lower Silesia) in the late 1940s and 1950s. After World War II, some Lemkos from Poland were moved to the renamed Skelivka. Today Skelivka is inhabited by Ukrainians and Lemkos. Until World War II, the town had a Roman Catholic church (and adjacent cemetery) which catered to the Polish population. During Soviet times the church was used as a barn and shed. It is now being restored as a Greek Catholic church.

Until 18 July 2020, Skelivka belonged to Staryi Sambir Raion. The raion was abolished in July 2020 as part of the administrative reform of Ukraine, which reduced the number of raions of Lviv Oblast to seven. The area of Staryi Sambir Raion was merged into Sambir Raion.

A railway station of the Zagórz-Khyriv-Dobromyl railroad is located in Skelivka.
Felsztyn is passingly mentioned in the famous Czech novel The Good Soldier Švejk by Jaroslav Hašek, and has been included in a tourist route .

Population
 1880 - 920
 1936 - 1140
 2001 - 1062

Notable people
Walenty Herburt  (1524 – 1572), Bishop of Przemyśl
Jan Herburt (1524–1577), royal secretary
Sebastian z Felsztyna  (c.1480–1490 – after 1543), Polish composer and music theorist,
Dovid Shlomo Novoseller (1877-1966), rabbi and philanthropist

References

Villages in Sambir Raion
Holocaust locations in Ukraine